During the 1994–95 English football season, Millwall F.C. competed in the Football League First Division.

Season summary
In the 1994–95 season, expectations for another promotion push remained unfulfilled with the Lions finishing in 12th place. However, there was plenty of excitement in cup competitions back in 1995 with Premier League giants Nottingham Forest, Arsenal and Chelsea all falling victim to the Lions on their own grounds in the two major competitions.

Final league table

Results
Millwall's score comes first

Legend

Football League First Division

FA Cup

League Cup

Squad

References

Millwall F.C. seasons
Millwall